The Nanjing Massacre or the Rape of Nanjing (formerly romanized as Nanking) was the mass murder of Chinese civilians in Nanjing, the capital of the Republic of China, immediately after the Battle of Nanking in the Second Sino-Japanese War, by the Imperial Japanese Army. Beginning on December 13, 1937, the massacre lasted six weeks. The perpetrators also committed other war crimes such as mass rape, looting, and arson. The massacre was one of the worst atrocities committed during World War II.

The Japanese Army had pushed quickly through China after capturing Shanghai in November 1937. By early December, it was on the outskirts of Nanjing. The speed of the army's advance was likely due to commanders allowing looting and rape along the way.  As the Japanese approached, the Chinese army withdrew the bulk of its forces since Nanjing was not a defensible position. The civilian government of Nanjing fled, leaving the city under the de facto control of German citizen John Rabe, who had founded the International Committee for the Nanking Safety Zone. On December 5, Prince Yasuhiko Asaka was installed as Japanese commander in the campaign. Whether Asaka ordered the Rape, or simply stood by as it happened, is disputed, but he took no action to stop the carnage.

The first Japanese troops reached the city on December 13, and faced little resistance. The massacre began the same day, with Japanese troops running entirely unchecked. Chinese soldiers were summarily executed in violation of the laws of war. Women and girls were raped en masse and looting was widespread. Due to multiple factors, death toll estimates vary from 40,000 to over 300,000, with rape cases ranging from 20,000 to over 80,000 cases. However, most credible scholars in Japan, which include a large number of authoritative academics, support the validity of the International Military Tribunal for the Far East and its findings, which estimate at least 200,000 murders and at least 20,000 cases of rape.

The massacre finally wound down in early 1938. John Rabe's Safety Zone was mostly a success, and is credited with saving at least 200,000 lives. After the war, multiple Japanese military officers and Kōki Hirota, former Prime Minister of Japan and foreign minister during the atrocities, were found guilty of war crimes and executed. Some other Japanese military leaders in charge at the time of the Nanjing Massacre were not tried only because by the time of the tribunals they had either already been killed or committed seppuku (ritual suicide). Prince Asaka, as part of the Imperial Family, was granted immunity and never tried. The massacre has remained a wedge issue between modern China and Japan. Historical revisionists and nationalists in Japan have been accused of minimizing or denying the massacre.

Military situation 
In August 1937, the Japanese army invaded Shanghai, where they met strong resistance and suffered heavy casualties. The battle was bloody as both sides faced attrition in urban hand-to-hand combat. By mid-November, the Japanese had captured Shanghai with the help of naval and aerial bombardment. The General Staff Headquarters in Tokyo initially decided not to expand the war due to the high casualties incurred and the low morale of the troops. Nevertheless, on December 1, headquarters ordered the Central China Area Army and the 10th Army to capture Nanjing, then-capital of the Republic of China.

Relocation of the capital 
After losing the Battle of Shanghai, Chiang Kai-shek knew that the fall of Nanjing was a matter of time. He and his staff realized that they could not risk the annihilation of their elite troops in a symbolic but hopeless defense of the capital. To preserve the army for future battles, most of it was withdrawn. Chiang's strategy was to follow the suggestion of his German advisers to draw the Japanese army deep into China and use China's vast territory as a defensive strength. Chiang planned to fight a protracted war of attrition to wear down the Japanese in the hinterland of China.

Strategy for the defense of Nanjing 
In a press release to foreign reporters, Tang Shengzhi announced the city would not surrender and would fight to the death. Tang gathered about 100,000 soldiers, largely untrained, including Chinese troops who had participated in the Battle of Shanghai. The Chinese government left for relocation on December 1, and the president left on December 7, leaving the fate of Nanjing to an International Committee led by John Rabe, a German national.

From this gunboat, Rabe sent two telegrams. The first was to Chiang through an American ambassador in Hankow, asking that Chinese forces "undertake no military operations" within Nanjing. The second telegram was sent through Shanghai to Japanese military leaders, advocating for a three-day ceasefire so that the Chinese could withdraw from the city.

The following day, on December 10, Rabe got his answer from the Generalissimo. The American ambassador in Hankow replied that although he supported Rabe's proposal for a ceasefire, Chiang did not. Rabe says that the ambassador also "sent us a separate confidential telegram telling us that he has been officially informed by the Foreign Ministry in Hankow that our understanding that General Tang agreed to a three-day armistice and the withdrawal of his troops from Nanjing is mistaken, and moreover that Chiang Kai-shek has announced that he is not in a position to accept such an offer." This rejection of the committee's ceasefire plan, in Rabe's mind, sealed the fate of the city. Nanjing had been constantly bombed for days and the Chinese troops that remained there were disheartened and had taken to drinking before the city's inevitable fall.

On December 11, Rabe found that Chinese soldiers were still residing in areas of the Safety Zone, meaning that it became an intended target for Japanese attacks despite the majority being innocent civilians. Rabe commented on how efforts to remove these Chinese troops failed and Japanese soldiers began to lob grenades into the refugee zone.

Approach of the Imperial Japanese Army

Japanese war crimes on the march to Nanjing 

Although the massacre is generally described as having occurred over a six-week period after the fall of Nanjing, the crimes committed by the Japanese army were not limited to that period. Many atrocities were reported to have been committed as the Japanese army advanced from Shanghai to Nanjing.

According to one Japanese journalist embedded with Imperial forces at the time:The reason that the [10th Army] is advancing to Nanjing quite rapidly is due to the tacit consent among the officers and men that they could loot and rape as they wish.In his novel Ikiteiru Heitai ('Living Soldiers'), Tatsuzō Ishikawa vividly describes how the 16th Division of the Shanghai Expeditionary Force committed atrocities on the march between Shanghai and Nanjing. The novel itself was based on interviews that Ishikawa conducted with troops in Nanjing in January 1938.

Perhaps the most notorious atrocity was a killing contest between two Japanese officers as reported in the Tokyo Nichi Nichi Shimbun and the English-language Japan Advertiser. The contest—a race between the two officers to see who could kill 100 people first using only a sword—was covered much like a sporting event with regular updates on the score over a series of days. In Japan, the veracity of the newspaper article about the contest was the subject of ferocious debate for several decades starting in 1967.

In 2000, historian Bob Tadashi Wakabayashi concurred with certain Japanese scholars who had argued that the contest was a concocted story, with the collusion of the soldiers themselves for the purpose of raising the national fighting spirit.

In 2005, a Tokyo district judge dismissed a suit by the families of the lieutenants, stating that "the lieutenants admitted the fact that they raced to kill 100 people" and that the story cannot be proven to be clearly false. The judge also ruled against the civil claim of the plaintiffs because the original article was more than 60 years old. The historicity of the event remains disputed in Japan.

Retreating Chinese Troops' Scorched-Earth Policy 
The Nanjing garrison force set fire to buildings and houses in the areas close to Xiakuan to the north as well as in the environs of the eastern and southern city gates. Targets within and outside of the city walls—such as military barracks, private homes, the Chinese Ministry of Communication, forests and even entire villages—were completely burnt down, at an estimated value of US$20–30 million (1937).

Establishment of the Nanking Safety Zone 

Many Westerners were living in the city at that time, conducting trade or on missionary trips. As the Japanese army approached Nanjing, most of them fled the city, leaving 27 foreigners. Five of these were journalists who remained in the city a few days after it was captured, leaving the city on December 16. Fifteen of the remaining 22 foreigners formed a committee, called the International Committee for the Nanking Safety Zone in the western quarter of the city.

German businessman John Rabe was elected as its leader, in part because of his status as a member of the Nazi Party and the existence of the German-Japanese bilateral Anti-Comintern Pact. The Japanese government had previously agreed not to attack parts of the city that did not contain Chinese military forces, and the members of the Committee managed to persuade the Chinese government to move their troops out of the area. The Nanking Safety Zone was demarcated through the use of Red Cross Flags.

On December 1, 1937, Nanjing Mayor Ma Chaochun ordered all Chinese citizens remaining in Nanjing to move into the "Safety Zone." Many fled the city on December 7, and the International Committee took over as the de facto government of Nanjing.

Minnie Vautrin was a Christian missionary who established Ginling Girls College in Nanking, which was within the established Safety Zone. During the massacre, she worked tirelessly in welcoming thousands of female refugees to stay in the college campus, sheltering up to 10,000 women.

Prince Asaka appointed as commander 

In a memorandum for the palace rolls, Hirohito singled Prince Yasuhiko Asaka out for censure as the one imperial kinsman whose attitude was "not good." He assigned Asaka to Nanjing as an opportunity to make amends.

On December 5, Asaka left Tokyo by plane and arrived at the front three days later. He met with division commanders, lieutenant-generals Kesago Nakajima and Heisuke Yanagawa, who informed him that the Japanese troops had almost completely surrounded 300,000 Chinese troops in the vicinity of Nanjing and that preliminary negotiations suggested that the Chinese were ready to surrender.

Prince Asaka issued an order to "kill all captives," thus providing official sanction for the crimes which took place during and after the battle. Some authors record that Prince Asaka signed the order for Japanese soldiers in Nanjing to "kill all captives". Others assert that lieutenant colonel Isamu Chō, Asaka's aide-de-camp, sent this order under the Prince's sign-manual without the Prince's knowledge or assent. Nevertheless, even if Chō took the initiative, Asaka was nominally the officer in charge and gave no orders to stop the carnage. While the extent of Prince Asaka's responsibility for the massacre remains a matter of debate, the ultimate sanction for the massacre and the crimes committed during the invasion of China were issued in Emperor Hirohito's ratification of the Japanese army's proposition to remove the constraints of international law on the treatment of Chinese prisoners on August 5, 1937.

Battle of Nanking

Siege of the city 
The Japanese military continued to move forward, breaching the last lines of Chinese resistance, and arriving outside the city gates of Nanjing on December 9.

Demand for surrender 
At noon on December 9, the Japanese military dropped leaflets into the city, urging the city of Nanjing to surrender within 24 hours, promising "no mercy" if the offer was refused.

In the meantime, members of the Committee contacted Tang and proposed a plan for three-day cease-fire, during which the Chinese troops could withdraw without fighting while the Japanese troops would stay in their present position.

John Rabe boarded the U.S. gunboat  on December 9 and sent two telegrams, one to Chiang Kai-shek by way of the American ambassador in Hankow (Hankou), and one to the Japanese military authority in Shanghai.

Assault and capture of Nanjing 

The Japanese awaited an answer to their demand for surrender but no response was received from the Chinese by the deadline on December 10. General Iwane Matsui waited another hour before issuing the command to take Nanjing by force. The Japanese army mounted its assault on the Nanjing walls from multiple directions; the SEF's 16th Division attacked three gates on the eastern side, the 6th Division of the 10A launched its offensive on the western walls, and the SEF's 9th Division advanced into the area in-between.

On December 12, under heavy artillery fire and aerial bombardment, General Tang Sheng-chi ordered his men to retreat. What followed was nothing short of chaos. Some Chinese soldiers stripped civilians of their clothing in a desperate attempt to blend in, and many others were shot by the Chinese supervisory unit as they tried to flee.

On 13 December, the 6th and the 116th Divisions of the Japanese Army were the first to enter the city, facing little military resistance. Simultaneously, the 9th Division entered nearby Guanghua Gate, and the 16th Division entered the Zhongshan and Taiping gates. That same afternoon, two small Japanese Navy fleets arrived on both sides of the Yangtze River.

Pursuit and mopping-up operations 
Japanese troops pursued the retreating Chinese army units, primarily in the Xiakuan area to the north of the city walls and around the Zijin Mountain in the east. Although most sources suggest that the final phase of the battle consisted of a one-sided slaughter of Chinese troops by the Japanese, some Japanese historians maintain that the remaining Chinese military still posed a serious threat to the Japanese. Prince Yasuhiko Asaka told a war correspondent later that he was in a very perilous position when his headquarters was ambushed by Chinese forces that were in the midst of fleeing from Nanjing east of the city. On the other side of the city, the 11th Company of the 45th Regiment encountered some 20,000 Chinese soldiers who were making their way from Xiakuan.

The Japanese army conducted its mopping-up operation both inside and outside the Nanking Safety Zone. Since the area outside the safety zone had been almost completely evacuated, the mopping-up effort was concentrated in the safety zone. The safety zone, an area of 3.85 square kilometres, was packed with the remaining population of Nanjing. The Japanese army leadership assigned sections of the safety zone to some units to separate alleged plain-clothed soldiers from the civilians. The number of Chinese soldiers in plain clothes that were executed is estimated to be around 4,000.

Civilian evacuation 
With the relocation of the capital of China and the reports of Japanese brutality, most of the civilian population fled Nanjing out of fear. Wealthy families were the first to flee, leaving Nanjing in automobiles, followed by the evacuation of the middle class and then the poor, while only the destitute lowest class such as the ethnic Tanka boat people remained behind. Three quarters of the population had fled Nanjing before the Japanese arrived.

Massacre 

From December 13, 1937, the Japanese Army engaged in random murder, wartime rape, looting, arson, and other war crimes. Such crime continued from three to six weeks depending on the types of crime. The first three weeks were more intense. A group of foreign expatriates headed by Rabe had formed a 15-man International Committee for the Nanking Safety Zone on November 22 and mapped out the Nanking Safety Zone in order to safeguard civilians in the city.

In a diary entry from Minnie Vautrin on December 15, 1937, she wrote about her experiences in the Safety Zone:
The Japanese have looted widely yesterday and today, have destroyed schools, have killed citizens, and raped women. One thousand disarmed Chinese soldiers, whom the International Committee hoped to save, were taken from them and by this time are probably shot or bayoneted. In our South Hill House Japanese broke the panel of the storeroom and took out some old fruit juice and a few other things.

Massacre contest 

In 1937, the Osaka Mainichi Shimbun and its sister newspaper, the Tokyo Nichi Nichi Shimbun, covered a contest between two Japanese officers, Toshiaki Mukai and Tsuyoshi Noda of the Japanese 16th Division. The two men were described as vying to be the first to kill 100 people with a sword before the capture of Nanjing. From Jurong to Tangshan (two cities in Jiangshu Province, China), Mukai had killed 89 people while Noda had killed 78. The contest continued because neither had killed 100 people. By the time they had arrived at Zijin Mountain, Noda had killed 105 people while Mukai had killed 106 people. Both officers supposedly surpassed their goal during the heat of battle, making it impossible to determine which officer had actually won the contest. Therefore, according to journalists Asami Kazuo and Suzuki Jiro, writing in the Tokyo Nichi Nichi Shimbun of December 13, they decided to begin another contest to kill 150 people.

Rape 

The International Military Tribunal for the Far East estimated that 20,000 women, including some children and the elderly, were raped during the occupation, with Yale University claiming over 80,000 rapes. A large number of rapes were done systematically by the Japanese soldiers as they went from door to door, searching for girls, with many women being captured and gang-raped. The women were often killed immediately after being raped, often through explicit mutilation, such as by penetrating vaginas with bayonets, long sticks of bamboo, or other objects.

On 19 December 1937, the Reverend James M. McCallum wrote in his diary:
I know not where to end. Never I have heard or read such brutality. Rape! Rape! Rape! We estimate at least 1,000 cases a night and many by day. In case of resistance or anything that seems like disapproval, there is a bayonet stab or a bullet.... People are hysterical... Women are being carried off every morning, afternoon and evening. The whole Japanese army seems to be free to go and come as it pleases, and to do whatever it pleases.

On March 7, 1938, Robert O. Wilson, a surgeon at the university hospital in the Safety Zone administrated by the United States, wrote in a letter to his family, "a conservative estimate of people slaughtered in cold blood is somewhere about 100,000, including of course thousands of soldiers that had thrown down their arms." Here are two excerpts from his letters of 15 and 18 December 1937 to his family:The slaughter of civilians is appalling. I could go on for pages telling of cases of rape and brutality almost beyond belief. Two bayoneted corpses are the only survivors of seven street cleaners who were sitting in their headquarters when Japanese soldiers came in without warning or reason and killed five of their number and wounded the two that found their way to the hospital.

Let me recount some instances occurring in the last two days. Last night the house of one of the Chinese staff members of the university was broken into and two of the women, his relatives, were raped. Two girls, about 16, were raped to death in one of the refugee camps. In the University Middle School where there are 8,000 people the Japs came in ten times last night, over the wall, stole food, clothing, and raped until they were satisfied. They bayoneted one little boy of eight who [had] five bayonet wounds including one that penetrated his stomach, a portion of omentum was outside the abdomen. I think he will live.

In his diary kept during the aggression against the city and its occupation by the Imperial Japanese Army, the leader of the Safety Zone, John Rabe, wrote many comments about Japanese atrocities. For 17 December:Two Japanese soldiers have climbed over the garden wall and are about to break into our house. When I appear they give the excuse that they saw two Chinese soldiers climb over the wall. When I show them my party badge, they return the same way. In one of the houses in the narrow street behind my garden wall, a woman was raped, and then wounded in the neck with a bayonet. I managed to get an ambulance so we can take her to Kulou Hospital ... Last night up to 1,000 women and girls are said to have been raped, about 100 girls at Ginling College...alone. You hear nothing but rape. If husbands or brothers intervene, they're shot. What you hear and see on all sides is the brutality and bestiality of the Japanese soldiers.

In a documentary film about the Nanjing Massacre, In the Name of the Emperor, a former Japanese soldier named Shiro Azuma spoke candidly about the process of rape and murder in Nanjing.

 At first we used some kinky words like Pikankan. Pi means "hip," kankan means "look." Pikankan means, "Let's see a woman open up her legs." Chinese women didn't wear under-pants. Instead, they wore trousers tied with a string. There was no belt. As we pulled the string, the buttocks were exposed. We "pikankan." We looked. After a while we would say something like, "It's my day to take a bath," and we took turns raping them. It would be all right if we only raped them. I shouldn't say all right. But we always stabbed and killed them. Because dead bodies don't talk.
Iris Chang, author of the Rape of Nanjing (book), wrote one of the most comprehensive accounts of Japanese war atrocities in China. In her book, she estimated that the number of Chinese women raped by Japanese soldiers ranged from 20,000 to 80,000. Chang also states that not all rape victims were women. Some Chinese men were sodomized and forced to perform "repulsive sex acts". There are also accounts of Japanese troops coercing families to commit incestuous acts. Sons were coerced in to rape their mothers,  fathers were forced to rape their daughters, and brothers were forced to rape their sisters. Instead of punishing the Japanese troops who were responsible for wholesale rape, "'The Japanese expeditionary Force in Central China issued an order to set up comfort houses during this period of time,' Yoshimi Yoshiaki, a prominent history professor at Chuo University, observes, 'because Japan was afraid of criticism from China, the United States of America and Europe following the case of massive rapes between battles in Shanghai and Nanjing.'"

Massacre of civilians 

For about three weeks since December 13, 1937, the Imperial Japanese Army entered the Nanking Safety Zone to search for former Chinese soldiers hidden among refugees. Many innocent men were misidentified and killed.

The death toll of civilians is difficult to precisely calculate due to the many bodies deliberately burnt, buried in mass graves, or dumped into the Yangtze River. Robert O. Wilson, a physician, testified that cases of gun wounds "continued to come in [to the hospital of University of Nanjing] for a matter of some six or seven weeks following the fall of the city on December 13, 1937. The capacity of the hospital was normally one hundred and eighty beds, and this was kept full to overflowing during this entire period. B. Campbell described the Nanjing Massacre as a genocide, given the fact that residents were still slaughtered en masse during the aftermath, despite the successful and certain outcome in battle. However, Jean-Louis Margolin does not believe that the Nanjing atrocities should be considered a genocide because only prisoners of war were executed in a systematic manner and the targeting of civilians was sporadic and done without orders by individual actors. On 13 December 1937, John Rabe wrote in his diary:It is not until we tour the city that we learn the extent of destruction. We come across corpses every 100 to 200 yards. The bodies of civilians that I examined had bullet holes in their backs. These people had presumably been fleeing and were shot from behind. The Japanese march through the city in groups of ten to twenty soldiers and loot the shops.... I watched with my own eyes as they looted the café of our German baker Herr Kiessling. Hempel's hotel was broken into as well, as [was] almost every shop on Chung Shang and Taiping Road.

American vice consul James Espy arrived in Nanjing on January 6, 1938, to reopen the American embassy. He gave a summarized description of what happened in the city:

The picture that they painted of Nanking was one of a reign of terror that befell the city upon its occupation by the Japanese military forces. Their stories and those of the German residents tell of the city having fallen into the hands of the Japanese as captured prey, not merely taken in the course of organized warfare but seized by an invading army whose members seemed to have set upon the prize to commit unlimited depredations and violence. Fuller data and our own observations have not brought out facts to discredit their information. The civilian Chinese population remaining in the city crowded the streets of the so-called "safety zone" as refugees, many of whom are destitute. Physical evidences are almost everywhere to the killing of men, women and children, of the breaking into and looting of property and of the burning and destruction of houses and buildings.
It remains, however, the Japanese soldiers swarmed over the city in thousands and committed untold depredations and atrocities. It would seem according to stories told us by foreign witnesses that the soldiers were let loose like a barbarian horde to desecrate the city. Men, women and children were killed in uncounted numbers throughout the city. Stories are heard of civilians being shot or bayoneted for no apparent reason.

On 10 February 1938, Legation Secretary of the German Embassy, Rosen, wrote to his Foreign Ministry about a film made in December by Reverend John Magee to recommend its purchase.

During the Japanese reign of terror in Nanjing—which, by the way, continues to this day to a considerable degree—the Reverend John Magee, a member of the American Episcopal Church Mission who has been here for almost a quarter of a century, took motion pictures that eloquently bear witness to the atrocities committed by the Japanese.... One will have to wait and see whether the highest officers in the Japanese army succeed, as they have indicated, in stopping the activities of their troops, which continue even today.

On December 13, about 30 soldiers came to a Chinese house at No. 5 Hsing Lu Koo in the southeastern part of Nanjing and demanded entrance. The door was open by the landlord, a Mohammedan named Ha. They killed him immediately with a revolver and also Mrs. Ha, who knelt before them after Ha's death, begging them not to kill anyone else. Mrs. Ha asked them why they killed her husband and they shot her. Mrs. Hsia was dragged out from under a table in the guest hall where she had tried to hide with her 1-year-old baby. After being stripped and raped by one or more men, she was bayoneted in the chest and then had a bottle thrust into her vagina. The baby was killed with a bayonet. Some soldiers then went to the next room, where Mrs. Hsia's parents, aged 76 and 74, and her two daughters aged 16 and 14 [were]. They were about to rape the girls when the grandmother tried to protect them. The soldiers killed her with a revolver. The grandfather grasped the body of his wife and was killed. The two girls were then stripped, the elder being raped by 2–3 men and the younger by 3. The older girl was stabbed afterwards and a cane was rammed in her vagina. The younger girl was bayoneted also but was spared the horrible treatment that had been meted out to her sister and mother. The soldiers then bayoneted another sister of between 7–8, who was also in the room. The last murders in the house were of Ha's two children, aged 4 and 2 respectively. The older was bayoneted and the younger split down through the head with a sword.

On 5 February 2009, the Japanese Supreme Court ordered Shūdō Higashinakano and the publisher Tendensha to pay four million yen in damages to Mrs. Shuqin Xia, who claims to be the 7- or 8-year-old girl who appears in Magee's film. Higashinakano had claimed in his book, Thorough Review of Nanjing Massacre, that she and the girl were different persons, and that she was not a witness of the Nanjing massacre, but he was unable to prove this at trial.

Pregnant women were targeted for murder, as their stomachs were often bayoneted, sometimes after rape. Tang Junshan, survivor and witness to one of the Japanese army's systematic mass killings, testified:
The seventh and last person in the first row was a pregnant woman. The soldier thought he might as well rape her before killing her, so he pulled her out of the group to a spot about ten meters away. As he was trying to rape her, the woman resisted fiercely.... The soldier abruptly stabbed her in the belly with a bayonet. She gave a final scream as her intestines spilled out. Then the soldier stabbed the fetus, with its umbilical cord clearly visible, and tossed it aside.

According to Navy veteran Sho Mitani, "The Army used a trumpet sound that meant 'Kill all Chinese who run away'." Thousands were led away and mass-executed in an excavation known as the "Ten-Thousand-Corpse Ditch", a trench measuring about 300 m long and 5 m wide. Since records were not kept, estimates regarding the number of victims buried in the ditch range from 4,000 to 20,000. However, most scholars and historians consider the number to be more than 12,000 victims.

The Hui people, a minority Chinese group, the majority of them Muslim, suffered as well during the massacre. One mosque was found destroyed and others found to be "filled with dead bodies." Hui volunteers and imams buried over a hundred of their dead following Muslim ritual.

Extrajudicial killing of Chinese prisoners of war 

Soon after the fall of the city, Japanese troops made a thorough search for Chinese soldiers and summarily arrested thousands of young Chinese men. Many were taken to the Yangtze River, where they were machine-gunned to death. What was probably the single largest massacre of Chinese troops, the Straw String Gorge Massacre, occurred along the banks of the Yangtze River on December 18. For most of the morning, Japanese soldiers tied the POWs' hands together. At dusk, the soldiers divided POWs into four columns and opened fire. Unable to escape, the POWs could only scream and thrash desperately. It took an hour for the sounds of death to stop and even longer for the Japanese to bayonet each individual. The majority of the bodies were dumped directly into the Yangtze River.

Japanese troops gathered 1,300 Chinese soldiers and civilians at Taiping Gate and murdered them. The victims were blown up with landmines, then doused with petrol and set on fire. The survivors were killed with bayonets.

U.S. news correspondents F. Tillman Durdin and Archibald Steele reported seeing corpses of massacred Chinese soldiers forming mounds six feet high at the Nanjing Yijiang gate in the north. Durdin, who worked for The New York Times, toured Nanjing before his departure from the city. He heard waves of machine-gun fire and witnessed the Japanese soldiers gun down some two hundred Chinese within ten minutes. He would later state that he had seen tank guns used on bound soldiers.

Two days later, in his report to The New York Times, Durdin stated that the alleys and streets were filled with the dead, amongst them women and children. Durdin stated "[i]t should be said that certain Japanese units exercised restraint and that certain Japanese officers tempered power with generosity and commission," but continued "the conduct of the Japanese army as a whole in Nanjing was a blot on the reputation of their country"."

Ralph L. Phillips, a missionary, testified to the U.S. State Assembly Investigating Committee, that he was "forced to watch while the Japs disembowled a Chinese soldier" and "roasted his heart and liver and ate them."

Looting and arson 
"In the first days of the occupation the soldiers [...] took a great deal of bedding, cooking utensils and food from the refugees. Practically every building in the city was entered many, many times by these roving gangs of soldiers throughout the first six or seven weeks of the occupation". "[T]here was no burning until the Japanese troops had been in the city five or six days. Beginning, I believe, on the 19th or 20th of December, burning was carried on regularly for six weeks."

One-third of the city was destroyed as a result of arson. According to reports, Japanese troops torched newly built government buildings as well as the homes of many civilians. There was considerable destruction to areas outside the city walls. Soldiers pillaged from the poor and the wealthy alike. The lack of resistance from Chinese troops and civilians in Nanjing meant that the Japanese soldiers were free to divide up the city's valuables as they saw fit. This resulted in widespread looting and burglary.

On 17 December, chairman John Rabe wrote a complaint to Kiyoshi Fukui, second secretary of the Japanese Embassy. The following is an excerpt:
In other words, on the 13th when your troops entered the city, we had nearly all the civilian population gathered in a Zone in which there had been very little destruction by stray shells and no looting by Chinese soldiers even in full retreat.... All 27 Occidentals in the city at that time and our Chinese population were totally surprised by the reign of robbery, raping and killing initiated by your soldiers on the 14th. All we are asking in our protest is that you restore order among your troops and get the normal city life going as soon as possible. In the latter process we are glad to cooperate in any way we can. But even last night between 8 and 9 p.m. when five Occidental members of our staff and Committee toured the Zone to observe conditions, we did not find any single Japanese patrol either in the Zone or at the entrances!

Nanking Safety Zone and the role of foreigners 
The Japanese troops did respect the Zone to an extent; until the Japanese occupation, no shells entered that part of the city except a few stray shots. During the chaos following the attack of the city, some were killed in the Safety Zone, but the crimes that occurred in the rest of the city were far greater by all accounts.

Rabe wrote that, from time to time, the Japanese would enter the Safety Zone at will, carry off a few hundred men and women, and either summarily execute them or rape and then kill them.

By February 5, 1938, the International Committee for the Nanking Safety Zone had forwarded to the Japanese embassy a total of 450 cases of murder, rape, and general disorder by Japanese soldiers that had been reported after the American, British and German diplomats had returned to their embassies:
 "Case 5 – On the night of December 14th, there were many cases of Japanese soldiers entering houses and raping women or taking them away. This created panic in the area and hundreds of women moved into the Ginling College campus yesterday."
 "Case 10 – On the night of December 15th, a number of Japanese soldiers entered the University of Nanjing buildings at Tao Yuen and raped 30 women on the spot, some by six men."
 "Case 13 – December 18, 4 p.m., at No. 18 I Ho Lu, Japanese soldiers wanted a man's cigarette case and when he hesitated, one of the soldier crashed in the side of his head with a bayonet. The man is now at the University Hospital and is not expected to live."
 "Case 14 – On December 16, seven girls (ages ranged from 16 to 21) were taken away from the Military College. Five returned. Each girl was raped six or seven times daily – reported December 18th."
 "Case 15 – There are about 540 refugees crowded in No. 83 and 85 on Canton Road.... More than 30 women and girls have been raped. The women and children are crying all nights. Conditions inside the compound are worse than we can describe. Please give us help."
 "Case 16 – A Chinese girl named Loh, who, with her mother and brother, was living in one of the Refugee Centers in the Refugee Zone, was shot through the head and killed by a Japanese soldier. The girl was 14 years old. The incident occurred near the Kuling Ssu, a noted temple on the border of the Refugee zone ..."
 "Case 19 – January 30th, about 5 p.m. Mr. Sone (of the Nanjing Theological Seminary) was greeted by several hundred women pleading with him that they would not have to go home on February 4th. They said it was no use going home they might just as well be killed for staying at the camp as to be raped, robbed or killed at home.... One old woman 62 years old went home near Hansimen and Japanese soldiers came at night and wanted to rape her. She said she was too old. So the soldiers rammed a stick up her. But she survived to come back."

It is said that Rabe rescued between 200,000 and 250,000 Chinese people.

Causes 
Jonathan Spence writes:[T]here is no obvious explanation for this grim event, nor can one be found. The Japanese soldiers, who had expected easy victory, instead had been fighting hard for months and had taken infinitely higher casualties than anticipated. They were bored, angry, frustrated, tired. The Chinese women were undefended, their menfolk powerless or absent. The war, still undeclared, had no clear-cut goal or purpose. Perhaps all Chinese, regardless of sex or age, seemed marked out as victims.The dehumanization of Chinese people in the Japanese education system is also blamed for why many ordinary soldiers were eager to engage in atrocities.

Literature
Eyewitness accounts include testimonies of expatriates engaged in humanitarian work (mostly physicians, professors, missionary and businessmen), journalists (both Western and Japanese), as well as the field diaries of military personnel. American missionary John Magee stayed behind to provide a 16 mm film documentary and first-hand photographs of the Nanjing Massacre. Rabe and American missionary Lewis S. C. Smythe, secretary of the International Committee and a professor of sociology at the University of Nanjing, recorded the actions of the Japanese troops and filed complaints with the Japanese embassy.

Matsui's reaction to the massacre 
On December 18, 1937, as General Iwane Matsui began to comprehend the full extent of the rape, murder, and looting in the city, he grew increasingly dismayed. He reportedly told one of his civilian aides:I now realize that we have unknowingly wrought a most grievous effect on this city. When I think of the feelings and sentiments of many of my Chinese friends who have fled from Nanjing and of the future of the two countries, I cannot but feel depressed. I am very lonely and can never get in a mood to rejoice about this victory.... I personally feel sorry for the tragedies to the people, but the Army must continue unless China repents. Now, in the winter, the season gives time to reflect. I offer my sympathy, with deep emotion, to a million innocent people.On New Year's Day, over a toast he confided to a Japanese diplomat: "My men have done something very wrong and extremely regrettable."

Matsui blamed the atrocities on the moral decline of the Japanese Army, saying:The Nanjing Incident was a terrible disgrace ... Immediately after the memorial services, I assembled the higher officers and wept tears of anger before them, as Commander-in-Chief ... I told them that after all our efforts to enhance the Imperial prestige, everything had been lost in one moment through the brutalities of the soldiers. And can you imagine it, even after that, these officers laughed at me ... I am really, therefore, quite happy that I, at least, should have ended this way, in the sense that it may serve to urge self-reflection on many more members of the military of that time.

End of the massacre 
In late January 1938, the Japanese army forced all refugees in the Safety Zone to return home, immediately claiming to have "restored order". After the establishment of the weixin zhengfu (the collaborating government) in 1938, order was gradually restored in Nanjing and atrocities by Japanese troops lessened considerably.

On 18 February 1938, the International Committee for the Nanking Safety Zone was forcibly renamed  the Nanjing International Rescue Committee, and the Safety Zone effectively ceased to function. The last refugee camps were closed in May 1938.

Recall of Matsui and Asaka 
In February 1938, both Prince Asaka and General Matsui were recalled to Japan. Matsui returned to retirement, but Prince Asaka remained on the Supreme War Council until the end of the war in August 1945. He was promoted to the rank of general in August 1939, though he held no further military commands.

Evidence collection 
The Japanese either destroyed or concealed important documents, severely reducing the amount of evidence available for confiscation. Between the declaration of a ceasefire on August 15, 1945, and the arrival of American troops in Japan on August 28, "the Japanese military and civil authorities systematically destroyed military, naval, and
government archives, much of which was from the period 1942–1945." Overseas troops in the Pacific and East Asia were ordered to destroy incriminating evidence of war crimes. Approximately 70 percent of the Japanese army's wartime records were destroyed. 
In regards to the Nanjing Massacre, Japanese authorities deliberately concealed wartime records, eluding confiscation from American authorities. Some of the concealed information was made public a few decades later. For example, a two-volume collection of military documents related to the Nanjing operations was published in 1989; and disturbing excerpts from Kesago Nakajima's diary, a commander at Nanjing, was published in the early 1980s.

Ono Kenji, a chemical worker in Japan, curated a collection of wartime diaries from Japanese veterans who fought in the Battle of Nanking in 1937. In 1994, nearly 20 diaries in his collection were published, which became an important source of evidence for the massacre. Official war journals and diaries were also published by Kaikosha, an organization of retired Japanese military veterans.

In early 1980s, after interviewing Chinese survivors and reviewing Japanese records, Japanese journalist Honda Katsuichi claimed that the Nanjing Massacre was not an isolated case, and that Japanese atrocities against the Chinese were common throughout the Lower Yangtze River since the battle of Shanghai. His claims have been corroborated with the diaries of other Japanese combatants and medics who fought in China.

Death toll estimates 

Numerous factors complicate the estimation of an accurate death toll.

According to American historian Edward J. Drea:

While the Germans, beginning in 1943, did engage in substantial efforts to obliterate evidence of such crimes as mass murder, and they destroyed a great deal of potentially incriminating records in 1945, a great deal survived, in part because not each one of the multiple copies had been burned. The situation was different in Japan. Between the announcement of a ceasefire on August 15, 1945, and the arrival of small advance parties of American troops in Japan on August 28, Japanese military and civil authorities systematically destroyed military, naval, and government archives, much of which was from the period 1942–1945. Imperial General Headquarters in Tokyo dispatched enciphered messages to field commands throughout the Pacific and East Asia ordering units to burn incriminating evidence of war crimes,
especially offenses against prisoners of war.

According to Yang Daqing, professor of History and International Affairs at George Washington University:

While it is standard practice for governments to destroy evidence in times of defeat, in the two weeks before the Allies arrived in Japan, various Japanese agencies—the military in particular—systematically destroyed sensitive documents to a degree perhaps unprecedented in history. Estimates of the impact of the destruction vary. Tanaka Hiromi, a professor at Japan’s National Defense Academy who has conducted extensive research into remaining Imperial Japanese Army and Navy documents in Japan and overseas, claims that less than 0.1 percent of the material ordered for destruction survived.

In 2003, the director of Japan's Military History Archives of National Institute for Defense Studies said that as much 70 percent of Japan's wartime records were destroyed.

Other factors include the mass disposal of Chinese corpses by Japanese soldiers; the revisionist tendencies of both Chinese and Japanese individuals and groups, who are driven by nationalistic and political motivations; and the subjectivity involved in the collection and interpretation of evidence. However, the most credible scholars in Japan, which include a large number of authoritative academics, support the validity of the International Military Tribunal for the Far East and its findings, which estimate at least 200,000 casualties and at least 20,000 cases of rape.

Historian Tokushi Kasahara states "more than 100,000 and close to 200,000, or maybe more." With the emergence of more information and data, he said that there is a possibility that the death toll could be higher. Hiroshi Yoshida concludes "more than 200,000" in his book. Tomio Hora supports the information found in the International Military Tribunal for the Far East, which estimates a death toll of at least 200,000. An estimate death toll of 300,000 has also been cited.

According to the International Military Tribunal for the Far East, estimates made at a later date indicate that the total number of civilians and prisoners of war murdered in Nanjing and its vicinity during the first six weeks of the Japanese occupation was over 200,000. These estimates are borne out by the figures of burial societies and other organizations, which testify to over 155,000 buried bodies. These figures also do not take into account those persons whose bodies were destroyed by burning, drowning or other means, or whose bodies were interred in mass graves. The most credible scholars in Japan, which include a large number of authoritative academics, support the validity of the tribunal and its findings.

According to the verdict of the Nanjing War Crimes Tribunal on 10 March 1947, there are "more than 190,000 mass slaughtered civilians and Chinese soldiers killed by machine gun by the Japanese army, whose corpses have been burned to destroy proof. Besides, we count more than 150,000 victims of barbarian acts buried by the charity organizations. We thus have a total of more than 300,000 victims." However, this estimate includes an accusation that the Japanese Army murdered 57,418 Chinese POWs at Mufushan, though the latest research indicates that between 4,000 and 20,000 were massacred, and it also includes the 112,266 corpses allegedly buried by the Chongshantang, a charitable association, though today mainstream historians agree that the Chongshantang's records were at least greatly exaggerated if not entirely fabricated. According to Bob Wakabayashi, he estimates the death toll within Nanjing City Wall to be around 40,000, mostly massacred in the first five days; while the total victims after a 3-month period in Nanjing and its surrounding six rural counties "far exceed 100,000 but fall short of 200,000". Wakabayashi concludes that estimates of over 200,000 are not credible.

John Rabe, Chairman of the International Committee for the Nanking Safety Zone, estimated that between 50,000 and 60,000 (civilians) were killed. However, Erwin Wickert, the editor of The diaries of John Rabe, points out that "It is likely that Rabe's estimate is too low, since he could not have had an overview of the entire municipal area during the period of the worst atrocities. Moreover, many troops of captured Chinese soldiers were led out of the city and down to the Yangtze, where they were summarily executed. But, as noted, no one actually counted the dead."

Harold Timperley, a journalist in China during the Japanese invasion, reported that at least 300,000 Chinese civilians were killed in Nanjing and elsewhere, and tried to send a telegram but was censored by the Japanese military in Shanghai. Other sources, including Iris Chang's The Rape of Nanjing, also conclude that the death toll reached 300,000. In December 2007, newly declassified U.S. government archive documents revealed that a telegraph by the U.S. ambassador to Germany in Berlin sent one day after the Japanese army occupied Nanjing, stated that he heard the Japanese ambassador in Germany boasting that the Japanese army had killed 500,000 Chinese soldiers and civilians as the Japanese army advanced from Shanghai to Nanjing. According to the archives research "The telegrams sent by the U.S. diplomats [in Berlin] pointed to the massacre of an estimated half a million people in Shanghai, Suzhou, Jiaxing, Hangzhou, Shaoxing, Wuxi and Changzhou".

According to documents in the UNESCO Memory of the World Register, at least 300,000 Chinese were killed.

In the 2010 Japan-China Joint History Research Committee meeting, scholars from the Japanese side set the maximum possible number of civilian victims at 200,000, with estimates of around 40,000 or 20,000. The Chinese scholars of the committee maintained that at least 300,000 were killed.

Range and duration 
The duration of the incident is naturally defined by its geography: the earlier the Japanese entered the area, the longer the duration. The Battle of Nanking ended on December 13, when the divisions of the Japanese Army entered the walled city of Nanjing. The Tokyo War Crime Tribunal defined the period of the massacre to the ensuing six weeks. More conservative estimates say that the massacre started on December 14, when the troops entered the Safety Zone, and that it lasted for six weeks. Historians who define the Nanjing Massacre as having started from the time that the Japanese Army entered Jiangsu province push the beginning of the massacre to around mid-November to early December (Suzhou fell on November 19), and extended the end of the massacre to late March 1938.

To many Japanese scholars, post-war estimations were distorted by "victor's justice", when Japan was condemned as the sole aggressor. They believed the 300,000 toll typified a "Chinese-style exaggeration" with disregard for evidence. Yet, in China, this figure has come to symbolize the justice, legality, and authority of the post-war trials condemning Japan as the aggressor.

War crimes tribunals 
Shortly after the surrender of Japan, the primary officers in charge of the Japanese troops at Nanjing were put on trial. General Matsui was indicted before the International Military Tribunal for the Far East for "deliberately and recklessly" ignoring his legal duty "to take adequate steps to secure the observance and prevent breaches" of the Hague Convention.

Other Japanese military leaders in charge at the time of the Nanjing Massacre were not tried. Prince Kan'in Kotohito, chief of staff of the Imperial Japanese Army during the massacre, had died before the end of the war in May 1945. Prince Asaka was granted immunity because of his status as a member of the imperial family. Isamu Chō, the aide to Prince Asaka, and whom some historians believe issued the "kill all captives" memo, had committed seppuku (ritual suicide) during the Battle of Okinawa.

Grant of immunity to Prince Asaka 
On May 1, 1946, SCAP officials interrogated Prince Asaka, who was the ranking officer in the city at the height of the atrocities, about his involvement in the Nanjing Massacre and the deposition was submitted to the International Prosecution Section of the Tokyo tribunal. Asaka denied the existence of any massacre and claimed never to have received complaints about the conduct of his troops.

Evidence and testimony 

The prosecution began the Nanjing phase of its case in July 1946. Dr. Robert O. Wilson, a surgeon and a member of the International Committee for the Nanking Safety Zone, took the witness stand first. Other members of the International Committee for the Nanking Safety Zone who took the witness stand included Miner Searle Bates and John Magee. George A. Fitch, Lewis S. C. Smythe, and James McCallum filed affidavits with their diaries and letters.

Another piece of evidence that was submitted to the tribunal was Harold Timperley's telegram regarding the Nanjing Massacre which had been intercepted and decoded by the Americans on January 17, 1938. One of the books by Hsü, Documents of the Nanking Safety Zone, was also adduced in court.

The entry for the same day in Matsui's diary read, "I could only feel sadness and responsibility today, which has been overwhelmingly piercing my heart. This is caused by the Army's misbehaviors after the fall of Nanjing and failure to proceed with the autonomous government and other political plans."

Matsui's defense 

Matsui asserted that he had never ordered the execution of Chinese POWs. He further argued that he had directed his army division commanders to discipline their troops for criminal acts, and was not responsible for their failure to carry out his directives. At trial, Matsui went out of his way to protect Prince Asaka by shifting blame to lower-ranking division commanders.

Verdict 
Kōki Hirota, Prime Minister of Japan at an earlier stage of the war, and a diplomat during the atrocities at Nanjing, was convicted of participating in "the formulation or execution of a common plan or conspiracy" (count 1), waging "a war of aggression and a war in violation of international laws, treaties, agreements and assurances against the Republic of China" (count 27) and count 55. Matsui was convicted by a majority of the judges at the Tokyo tribunal who ruled that he bore ultimate responsibility for the "orgy of crime" at Nanjing because, "He did nothing, or nothing effective, to abate these horrors."
Organized and wholesale murder of male civilians was conducted with the apparent sanction of the commanders on the pretext that Chinese soldiers had removed their uniforms and were mingling with the population. Groups of Chinese civilians were formed, bound with their hands behind their backs, and marched outside the walls of the city where they were killed in groups by machine gun fire and with bayonets. — From Judgment of the International Military Tribunal

Sentence 
On November 12, 1948, Matsui and Hirota, along with five other convicted Class-A war criminals, were sentenced to death by hanging. Eighteen others received lesser sentences. The death sentence imposed on Hirota, a six-to-five decision by the eleven judges, shocked the general public and prompted a petition on his behalf, which soon gathered over 300,000 signatures but did not succeed in commuting the Minister's sentence. All of them were hanged on 23 December 1948.

Other trials 
Hisao Tani, a lieutenant general for the 6th Division of the Imperial Japanese Army, was tried by the Nanjing War Crimes Tribunal in China. He was found guilty of war crimes, sentenced to death, and executed by shooting on 26 April 1947. However, according to historian Tokushi Kasahara, the evidence used to convict Hisao Tani was not convincing. Kasahara said that if there was a full investigation of the massacre, many other high ranking authorities, which include higher level commanders, army leaders and emperor Hirohito, could have been implicated.

In 1947, Toshiaki Mukai and Tsuyoshi Noda, the two officers responsible for the contest to kill 100 people, were both arrested and extradited to China. They were also tried by the Nanjing War Crimes Tribunal. On trial with them was Gunkichi Tanaka, a captain from the 6th Division who personally killed over 300 Chinese POWs and civilians with his sword during the massacre. All three men were found guilty of war crimes and sentenced to death. They were executed by shooting together on 28 January 1948.

Moritake Tanabe, the Chief of Staff of the Japanese 10th Army at the time of the massacre, was tried for unrelated for war crimes in the Dutch East Indies. He was sentenced to death and executed in 1949.

Memorials 
 In 1985, the Nanjing Massacre Memorial Hall was built by the Nanjing Municipal Government in remembrance of the victims and to raise awareness of the Nanjing Massacre. It is located near a site where thousands of bodies were buried, called the "pit of ten thousand corpses" (wàn rén kēng). , there is a total of 10,615 Nanjing Massacre victim names inscribed on a memorial wall.
 In 1995, Daniel Kwan held a photo exhibit in Los Angeles titled, "The Forgotten Holocaust".
 In 2005, John Rabe's former residence in Nanjing was renovated and now accommodates the "John Rabe and International Safety Zone Memorial Hall", which opened in 2006.
 On December 13, 2009, both the Chinese and Japanese monks held a religious assembly to mourn Chinese civilians killed by invading Japanese troops.
 On December 13, 2014, China held its first Nanjing Massacre Memorial Day.

On October 9, 2015, Documents of the Nanjing Massacre have been listed on the UNESCO Memory of the World Register.

Controversy 

China and Japan have both acknowledged the occurrence of wartime atrocities.

Cold War 
Before the 1970s, China did relatively little to draw attention to the Nanjing massacre. There was also virtually no public commemoration until after 1982. In her book Rape of Nanjing, Iris Chang asserted that the politics of the Cold War encouraged Chairman Mao to stay relatively silent about Nanjing in order to keep a trade relationship with Japan. Jung Chang and Jon Halliday's biography of Mao claims Mao never made any comment either contemporaneously or later in his life about the massacre, but did frequently remark with enduring bitterness about a political struggle between himself and Wang Ming which also occurred in December 1937. 

Mei Xiao-ao, the son of Mei Ju-ao, a Chinese justice who was present at the Tokyo war crime tribunal, published an essay claiming that in the early 1960s, Mei's father, inspired by the recent publication of a Japanese study on the destruction caused by the atomic bombs, tried calling for greater study of the massacre by Chinese historians of the time, but his ideas received a cold reception; he was reportedly accused of "stirring up national hatred and revenge" against the Japanese, and some others felt that writing about "the Chinese defeat and misery in Nanjing amounted to hidden praise for the strength of the Japanese troops." A study into the massacre was undertaken by a group of historians in the early 1960s, but supposedly due to political reasons it was restricted to the form of an "internal publication" in 1979.

Debate in Japan 

Associate Professor David Askew of Ritsumeikan Asia Pacific University said that in Japan, a unified Japanese view of the massacre doesn't exist because of the internal debates and contentions surrounding the massacre, and that the different views can be categorized into mutually exclusive groups. The "Great Massacre School" group supports the validity of the findings at the Tokyo Trials, and concludes that there were at least 200,000 casualties and at least 20,000 rape cases; whereas "The Illusion School" group rejects tribunal findings as "victor's justice". According to him, "of the two, however, the Great Massacre School is clearly the more sophisticated, counting among its members a large number of academics who bring a great deal of authority to their findings."

The debate concerning the massacre took place mainly in the 1970s, according to Higashinakano Shudo. He said that during this time, the Chinese government's statements about the event were attacked by the Japanese because they were said to rely too heavily on personal testimonies and anecdotal evidence. He further added that aspersions were cast regarding the authenticity and accuracy of burial records and photographs presented in the Tokyo War Crime Court, which the Japanese government claimed were fabrications by the Chinese government, artificially manipulated or incorrectly attributed to the Nanjing Massacre.

During the 1970s, Katsuichi Honda wrote a series of articles for the Asahi Shimbun on war crimes committed by Japanese soldiers during World War II (such as the Nanjing Massacre). The publication of these articles triggered a vehement response from Japanese right-wingers regarding the Japanese treatment of the war crimes. In response, Shichihei Yamamoto and Akira Suzuki wrote two controversial yet influential articles  which sparked the Japanese Negationist movement.

In 1984, in an attempt to refute the allegations of war crimes in Nanjing, the Japanese Army Veterans Association (Kaikosha) interviewed former Japanese soldiers who had served in the Nanjing area from 1937 to 1938. Instead of refuting the allegations, the interviewed veterans confirmed that a massacre had taken place and openly described and admitted to taking part in the atrocities. The results of the survey were published in the association's magazine, Kaiko, in 1985 along with an admission and apology that read, "Whatever the severity of war or special circumstances of war psychology, we just lose words faced with this mass illegal killing. As those who are related to the prewar military, we simply apologize deeply to the people of China. It was truly a regrettable act of barbarity."

Apology and condolences by the Prime Minister and Emperor of Japan 

On August 15, 1995, the fiftieth anniversary of the Surrender of Japan, the Japanese prime minister Tomiichi Murayama gave the first formal apology for Japanese actions during the war.

He offered his apology to all survivors and to the relatives and friends of the victims. That day, the prime minister and the Japanese Emperor Akihito pronounced statements of mourning at Tokyo's Nippon Budokan. Iris Chang, author of The Rape of Nanjing, criticized Murayama for not providing the written apology that had been expected. She said that the people of China "don't believe that an... unequivocal and sincere apology has ever been made by Japan to China" and that a written apology from Japan would send a better message to the international community.

Denials of the massacre by public officials in Japan 

A faction of Japanese politicians who are unapologetic to the deaths in Nanjing have triggered a recurring point of tension in Sino-Japanese relations.

In May 1994, Justice Minister Shigeto Nagano called the Nanjing Massacre a "fabrication".

On June 19, 2007, a group of around 100 Liberal Democratic Party (LDP) lawmakers again denounced the Nanjing Massacre as a fabrication, arguing that there was no evidence to prove the allegations of mass killings by Japanese soldiers. They accused Beijing of using the alleged incident as a "political advertisement".

On February 20, 2012, Takashi Kawamura, mayor of Nagoya, told a visiting delegation from Nanjing that the massacre "probably never happened". Two days later he defended his remarks, saying, "Even since I was a national Diet representative, I have said [repeatedly] there was no [Nanjing] massacre that resulted in murders of several hundred thousands of people."

On February 24, 2012, Tokyo governor Shintaro Ishihara denied the Nanjing massacre. He alleged it would have been impossible to kill so many people in such a short period of time. He alleged a death toll of 10,000.

On February 3, 2014, Naoki Hyakuta, a member of the board of governors of Japan's public broadcasting company, NHK, was quoted as saying the massacre never occurred. He said that there were isolated incidents of brutality but no widespread atrocity, and criticized the Tokyo Trials figure of 200,000.

Legacy

Effect on international relations 
The memory of the Nanjing Massacre has been a point of contention in Sino-Japanese relations since the early 1970s. Trade between the two nations is worth over $200 billion annually. Despite this, many Chinese people still have a strong sense of mistrust due to the memory of the atrocity and failure of reconciliation measures. This sense of mistrust is strengthened by Japan's unwillingness to admit to and apologize for the atrocities.

Takashi Yoshida described how changing political concerns and perceptions of the "national interest" in Japan, China, and the U.S. have shaped the collective memory of the Nanjing massacre. Yoshida contended that over time the event has acquired different meanings to different people. People from mainland China saw themselves as the victims. For Japan, it was a question they needed to answer but were reluctant to do so because they too identified themselves as victims after the A-bombs. The U.S., which served as the melting pot of cultures and is home to descendants of members of both Chinese and Japanese cultures, took up the mantle of investigator for the victimized Chinese. Yoshida has argued that the Nanjing Massacre has figured in the attempts of all three nations as they work to preserve and redefine national and ethnic pride and identity, assuming different kinds of significance based on each country's changing internal and external enemies.

Many Japanese prime ministers have visited the Yasukuni Shrine, a shrine for Japanese war deaths up until the end of the Second World War, which includes war criminals that were involved in the Nanjing Massacre. In the museum adjacent to the shrine, a panel informs visitors that there was no massacre in Nanjing, but that Chinese soldiers in plain clothes were "dealt with severely". In 2006 former Japanese prime minister Junichiro Koizumi made a pilgrimage to the shrine despite warnings from China and South Korea. His decision to visit the shrine regardless sparked international outrage. Although Koizumi denied that he was trying to glorify war or historical Japanese militarism, the Chinese Foreign Ministry accused Koizumi of "wrecking the political foundations of China-Japan relations". An official from South Korea said they would summon the Tokyo ambassador to protest.

The Massacre is sometimes compared to other disasters in China, which include the Great Chinese famine (1959–61) and the Cultural Revolution.

As a component of national identity 
Yoshida asserts that "Nanjing has figured in the attempts of all three nations [China, Japan and the United States] to preserve and redefine national and ethnic pride and identity, assuming different kinds of significance based on each country's changing internal and external enemies."

Japan 

Following the end of World War II, some circles of civil society in Japan reflected on the extent of the massacre and the participation of ordinary soldiers. Notably, the novelist  wrote a novel, Time (Jikan) in 1953, portraying the massacre from the point of view of a Chinese intellectual watching it happen. This novel has been translated into Chinese and Russian. Other eyewitnesses to the massacre also expressed their opinions in Japanese magazines in the 1950s and 1960s, but political shifts slowly eroded this tide of confessions.

In 21st century Japan, the Nanjing Massacre touches upon national identity and notions of "pride, honor and shame". Yoshida argues that "Nanjing crystallizes a much larger conflict over what should constitute the ideal perception of the nation: Japan, as a nation, acknowledges its past and apologizes for its wartime wrongdoings; or ... stands firm against foreign pressures and teaches Japanese youth about the benevolent and courageous martyrs who fought a just war to save Asia from Western aggression." Recognizing the Nanjing Massacre as such can be viewed in some circles in Japan as "Japan-bashing" (in the case of foreigners) or "self-flagellation" (in the case of Japanese).

The government of Japan believes it can not be denied that the killing of a large number of noncombatants, looting and other acts by the Japanese army occurred. However, the actual number of victims is hard to determine, according to the government of Japan. In the 2010 Japan-China Joint History Research Committee meeting, scholars from the Japanese side set the maximum possible number of civilian victims at 200,000, with estimates of around 40,000 or 20,000. The Chinese scholars of the committee maintained that at least 300,000 were killed. The range of the death toll estimated by Japanese historians is from tens of thousands to 200,000.

According to a brief reference to Nanjing at the Yasukuni museum in Tokyo, the Japanese general in charge gave his men maps showing foreign settlements and a civilian "safety zone", and ordered them to maintain strict military discipline. The visitor is left to assume they did. The museum notes only that "Chinese soldiers disguised in civilian clothes, which numbered around 4000 were severely prosecuted".

This nationalist view does not, however, represent a widely shared understanding of what happened at Nanjing, as illustrated by Japanese textbooks' rather different treatment of the atrocity. While the books' take on Nanjing is stilted and feels like the product of a committee, in various versions they acknowledge the deaths of thousands of Chinese including women and children, as well as looting, arson and assaults by Japanese soldiers. They do not mention sexual assaults.

Some conspiracy theories claim that the whole event was entirely made up by the CCP and Chinese Nationalists as a weapon to attack Japan, deny the truth and facts of the war, and to indirectly justify China's discriminatory policies against minority groups in Xinjiang and Tibet.

"During this period, when the Japanese Army occupied Nanjing it killed a large number of Chinese and carried out looting, arson and assaults. In regard to the number of victims of this Nanjing Massacre ... the Tokyo (War Crime) Trials later found it in excess of 200,000, and prosecuted Japan's responsibility severely", reads one Japanese textbook.

Another history textbook prepared by the Japanese Society for History Textbook Reform, which had been approved by the government in 2001, attempts to whitewash Japan's war record during the 1930s and early 1940s. It referred to the Nanjing massacre as an "incident", and glossed over the issue of comfort women. Indeed, there is only one sentence that refers to this event: "they [the Japanese troops] occupied that city in December."

China 
The Nanjing massacre has emerged as one fundamental keystone in the construction of the modern Chinese national identity. Modern Chinese (including most citizens of the PRC, partially in Taiwan, Hong Kong, and overseas) will refer to the Nanjing Massacre to explain certain stances they hold or ideas they have; this "national unifying event" holds true to middle-school educated peasants and to senior government officials alike.

The remembrance of the massacre has evolved drastically in China. Until 1982, mentioning of the massacre was suppressed in China because ideologically the communists would rather promote the "martyrs of class struggles" than wartime victims, especially when there were no communist heroes or any communists at all in Nanjing when the massacre happened. Only since the 1990s, through the revisionist Patriotic Education Campaign, the massacre has become a national memory as an episode of the "Century of Humiliation" prior to the communist founding of a "New China". This orthodox victimhood narrative has become entwined with the Chinese national identity and is very sensitive to the revisionist sentiments from the far-right in Japan, which makes the memory of the massacre a recurring point of tension in Sino-Japanese relations after 1982.

Australia 
Dockworkers in Australia were horrified by the massacre and refused to load pig iron onto ships heading for Japan, leading to the Dalfram Dispute of 1938.

Records 
In December 2007, the PRC government published the names of 13,000 people who were killed by Japanese troops in the Nanjing Massacre. According to Xinhua News Agency, it is the most complete record to date. The report consists of eight volumes and was released to mark the 70th anniversary of the start of the massacre. It also lists the Japanese army units that were responsible for each of the deaths and states the way in which the victims were killed. Zhang Xianwen, editor-in-chief of the report, states that the information collected was based on "a combination of Chinese, Japanese and Western raw materials, which is objective and just and is able to stand the trial of history". This report formed part of a 55-volume series about the massacre, the Collection of Historical Materials of Nanjing Massacre (南京大屠杀史料集).

See also

Notes

References

Citations

Sources 

 Chang, Iris, The Rape of Nanking: The Forgotten Holocaust of World War II, Foreword by William C. Kirby; Penguin US (Paper), 1998;

Further reading 

 Askew, David. "The International Committee for the Nanking Safety Zone: An Introduction" Sino-Japanese Studies Vol. 14, April 2002 (Article outlining membership and their reports of the events that transpired during the massacre)
 Askew, David, "The Nanjing Incident: An Examination of the Civilian Population" Sino-Japanese Studies Vol. 13, March 2001 (Article analyzes a wide variety of figures on the population of Nanking before, during, and after the massacre)
 Bergamini, David, "Japan's Imperial Conspiracy," William Morrow, New York; 1971.
 Brook, Timothy, ed. Documents on the Rape of Nanjing, Ann Arbor: The University of Michigan Press, 1999.   (Does not include the Rabe diaries but does include reprints of "Hsū Shuhsi, Documents of the Nanking Safety Zone, Kelly & Walsh, 1939".)
 Hua-ling Hu, American Goddess at the Rape of Nanking: The Courage of Minnie Vautrin, Foreword by Paul Simon; 2000,  
 Fujiwara, Akira "The Nanking Atrocity: An Interpretive Overview" Japan Focus October 23, 2007.
 Galbraith, Douglas, A Winter in China, London, 2006. . A novel focussing on the western residents of Nanking during the massacre.
 Harmsen, Peter. Nanjing 1937: Battle for a Doomed City. Philadelphia: Oxford: Casemate, 2015. 
 Higashinakano, Shudo, The Nanking Massacre: Fact Versus Fiction: A Historian's Quest for the Truth, Tokyo: Sekai Shuppan, 2005. 
 Higashinakano, Kobayashi and Fukunaga, Analyzing The 'Photographic Evidence' of The Nanking Massacre, Tokyo: Soshisha, 2005. 
 Honda, Katsuichi, Sandness, Karen trans. The Nanjing Massacre: A Japanese Journalist Confronts Japan's National Shame, London: M.E. Sharpe, 1999.  
 Hsū Shuhsi, ed. (1939), Documents of the Nanking Safety Zone (reprinted in Documents on the Rape of Nanjing Brook ed. 1999)
 Kajimoto, Masato "Mistranslations in Honda Katsuichi's the Nanjing Massacre" Sino-Japanese Studies, 13. 2 (March 2001) pp. 32–44
 Lu, Suping, They Were in Nanjing: The Nanjing Massacre Witnessed by American and British Nationals, Hong Kong University Press, 2004.
 Murase, Moriyasu,Watashino Jyugun Cyugoku-sensen(My China Front), Nippon Kikanshi Syuppan Center, 1987 (revised 2005). (includes disturbing photos, 149 page photogravure) 
 Qi, Shouhua. When the Purple Mountain Burns: A Novel San Francisco: Long River Press, 2005. 
 Qi, Shouhua. Purple Mountain: A Story of the Rape of Nanking (A novel) English Chinese Bilingual Edition (Paperback, 2009) 
 Rabe, John, The Good Man of Nanking: The Diaries of John Rabe, Vintage (Paper), 2000.  
 Robert Sabella, Fei Fei Li and David Liu, eds. Nanking 1937: Memory and Healing (Armonk, NY: M.E. Sharpe, 2002). .
 Wakabayashi, Bob Tadashi "The Nanking 100-Man Killing Contest Debate: War Guilt Amid Fabricated Illusions, 1971–75",The Journal of Japanese Studies, Vol. 26 No. 2 Summer 2000.
 Wakabayashi, Bob Tadashi The Nanking Atrocity, 1937–1938: Complicating the Picture, Berghahn Books, 2007, 
 Yamamoto, Masahiro Nanking: Anatomy of an Atrocity, Praeger Publishers, 2000, 
 Yang, Daqing. "Convergence or Divergence? Recent Historical Writings on the Rape of Nanjing" American Historical Review 104, 3 (June 1999). 842–865.
 Young, Shi; Yin, James. Rape of Nanking: Undeniable history in photographs Chicago: Innovative Publishing Group, 1997. 
 Zhang, Kaiyuan, ed. Eyewitnesses to Massacre, An East Gate Book, 2001 (includes documentation of American missionaries M.S. Bates, G.A. Fitch, E.H. Foster, J.G. Magee, J.H. MaCallum, W.P. Mills, L.S.C. Smythe, A.N. Steward, Minnie Vautrin and R.O. Wilson.)

External links 

 The Rape of Nanjing – Nanjing Massacre – documentary
 Rape of Nanjing videos
 Documents of Nanjing Massacre – UNESCO
 BBC News: Nanjing remembers massacre victims
 Online Documentary: The Nanjing Atrocities  A master's degree thesis that delves into the atrocity
 English translation of a classified Chinese document on the Nanjing Massacre
 Japanese Imperialism and the Massacre in Nanjing by Gao Xingzu, Wu Shimin, Hu Yungong, & Cha Ruizhen
 Kirk Denton, "Heroic Resistance and Victims of Atrocity: Negotiating the Memory of Japanese Imperialism in Chinese Museums"
 Nanjing Massacre history site: History, Photos and Articles
 'No massacre in Nanjing,' Japanese lawmakers say
 "Denying Genocide: The Evolution of the Denial of the Holocaust and the Nanjing Massacre," college research paper by Joseph Chapel, 2004
 Rape of Nanjing Original reports from The Times
 War and reconciliation: a tale of two countries
 Review of Iris Chang, The Rape of Nanjing: The Forgotten Holocaust of World War II
 The Ghosts of Nanjing: Mogollon Connection Special Series by Jesse Horn 
 The Nanjing Massacre Project: A Digital Archive of Documents & Photographs from American Missionaries Who Witnessed the Rape of Nanjing From the Special Collections of the Yale Divinity School Library
 The Nanjing Incident: Recent Research and Trends by David Askew in the Electronic Journal of Contemporary Japanese Studies, April 2002

 
World War II crimes
Anti-Chinese sentiment in Japan
Anti-Chinese violence in Asia
History of Asia
December 1937 events
January 1938 events
Japanese war crimes
Mass murder in 1937
Mass murder in 1938
Massacres in 1937
Massacres in 1938
Memory of the World Register in China
World War II sites in China
Genocides in Asia
1937 murders in China
Massacres of women
1937 in China
Genocidal rape